Laura Bell (born ) is an American author.

Biography
Bell is the author of the  acclaimed Claiming Ground: A Memoir published by the Knopf Doubleday Publishing Group at Random House. The memoir tells about her adventures in rural Wyoming. As noted in Publishers Weekly “Bell's extraordinary ability to impart a true sense of place on each page reveals a stark and stunning landscape populated with a playbill of peculiar personalities attracted to a life of solitude and hard physical work, and her life within this remarkable world.” 

Bell's work has been published in several collections. From the Wyoming Arts Council she has received two literature fellowships as well as the Neltje Blanchan Memorial Award and the Frank Nelson Doubleday Memorial Award.

Personal life
Bell lives in Cody, Wyoming, and since 2000 has worked there for the Nature Conservancy.

References

External links
Review of Claiming Ground in the San Francisco Chronicle
Review of Claiming Ground in Orion magazine

Living people
American women writers
Year of birth missing (living people)
21st-century American women